The Star Alliance was an oppositional political party in Benin, formed by the Builders and Managers of Freedom and Democracy, The Greens and the Union for Democracy and National Solidarity. It contested the 1999 and 2003 parliamentary elections.
At the Beninese parliamentary election, 2003, the party won 3 out of 83 seats.

Defunct political parties in Benin